Denis Kina (born 8 November 1992) is a German footballer who last played as a right-back for TSV Havelse.

Career
Kina made his professional debut for TSV Havelse in the 3. Liga on 5 September 2021 against Borussia Dortmund II.

References

External links
 
 
 
 

1992 births
Living people
Sportspeople from Bielefeld
Footballers from North Rhine-Westphalia
German footballers
Association football defenders
TSV Havelse players
FC Gütersloh 2000 players
3. Liga players
Regionalliga players
Oberliga (football) players